The Ethiopian Civil Service University (ECSU) is a public university in Ethiopia. Its purpose is capacity building in the public sector. It is located in the capital city of Addis Ababa and was founded in 1993.

Notable alumni

 Alemayehu Atomsa - politician and president of the Oromia Region
 Demitu Hambisa Bonsa - Ethiopian government minister.
 Birtukan Ayano Dadi - judge and diplomat
 Muktar Kedir - former president of the Oromia Region
 Ambachew Mekonnen - president of the Amhara Region
 Muktar Kedir - former president of the Oromia Region
 Ahmed Shide - Minister of Finance of Ethiopia

References

External links 
Ethiopian Civil Service University

Educational institutions established in 1995
Universities and colleges in Ethiopia
Civil service colleges
1995 establishments in Ethiopia